Brigid Pasulka is an American author and winner of the 2010 Hemingway Foundation/PEN Award for her novel A Long, Long Time Ago and Essentially True, which she wrote after spending a year in Krakow, Poland. Her second novel, The Sun and Other Stars, was published in 2014.

Pasulka, a descendant of Ukrainian and Polish immigrants, grew up in a farming township in Northern Illinois, and now lives in Chicago, where she currently teaches at Whitney Young Magnet High School.  She is a graduate of Dartmouth College and the Program for Writers at the University of Illinois at Chicago (M.A.).

References

External links

21st-century American novelists
American women novelists
21st-century American women writers
Hemingway Foundation/PEN Award winners
Living people
Dartmouth College alumni
Year of birth missing (living people)